The Centro Italiano Studi Vessillologici (Italian Centre of Vexillological Studies), or CISV, is a free, non-profit association of vexillology and heraldry lovers. The centre aims principally at promoting vexillological studies and preserving related documents. It was founded in 1972 in Turin and is a FIAV member since 1973.

Starting from 1974, the centre has an official, six-monthly, journal called Vexilla Italica (Latin for "Italian Flags"), reserved to its members.

See also
 FIAV

External links
 Official site 

International Federation of Vexillological Associations